James Gulley may refer to:
James Gulley (basketball) (born 1965), American basketball player
James L. Gulley, American cancer researcher and the Director of the Medical Oncology Service at National Cancer Institute

See also
Gulley surname 
James Manby Gully (1808-1883), Victorian medical doctor
Gully (disambiguation)